Simon Cheffins is a British-American percussionist. Founding member of Crash Worship, Blood Lake, and the Extra Action Marching Band. He currently resides in San Francisco, California.

References

British percussionists
American percussionists
Living people
Place of birth missing (living people)
Year of birth missing (living people)